Thomas Watts (21 August 1899 – 19 January 1976) was an English first-class cricketer active 1921–26 who played for Surrey. He was born in Kennington; died in St Helens, Lancashire.

References

1899 births
1976 deaths
English cricketers
Surrey cricketers